Michael Stickland (born 4 August 2002) is an English professional footballer who plays as a centre-back for the EFL Championship club Reading.

Career
Stickland made his professional debut with Reading in a 3–0 EFL Cup loss to Swansea City on 10 August 2021.

Career statistics

Club

References

External links
 

2002 births
Living people
English footballers
Reading F.C. players
Association football defenders